Operation DisrupTor was an international investigation targeting drug traffickers on the dark web. Coordinated by the Joint Criminal Opioid and Darknet Enforcement, the operation was initiated and managed by the Federal Bureau of Investigation. The operation also included assistance from the Drug Enforcement Administration, U.S. Immigration and Customs Enforcement, United States Secret Service, United States Postal Inspection Service, IRS Criminal Investigation, Bureau of Alcohol, Tobacco, Firearms and Explosives, and local law enforcement agencies.

The investigation resulted in 179 arrests worldwide, in addition to 6.5 million dollars in seized funds (including digital currency) and 500 kilograms of drugs.

The operation was announced on September 22, 2020 by Deputy Attorney General Jeffrey A. Rosen at a joint press conference. The name of the operation is a portmanteau of "disrupt" and Tor, an open-source anonymity network that is often used to access the dark web.

References

External links

 https://www.justice.gov/usao-dc/press-release/file/1301021/download

 https://www.justice.gov/usao-wdpa/press-release/file/1318346/download
 https://www.justice.gov/usao-wdpa/press-release/file/1318351/download
 https://www.justice.gov/usao-wdpa/press-release/file/1318341/download
 https://www.justice.gov/usao-wdpa/press-release/file/1318331/download
 https://www.justice.gov/opa/page/file/1318706/download
 https://www.justice.gov/opa/page/file/1318771/download
 https://www.justice.gov/opa/page/file/1318671/download
 https://www.justice.gov/opa/page/file/1318776/download

Federal Bureau of Investigation operations
United States intelligence operations
2020 in American law
Cybercrime